America is the tenth studio album by German duo Modern Talking, released on 19 March 2001 by Hansa Records. The album entered the German Albums Chart at number two on 2 April 2001, spending five weeks in the top 10 and 15 weeks altogether on chart.

Track listing

Personnel

 Dieter Bohlen – production
 Axel Breitung – co-production, arrangements 
 Thorsten Brötzmann – co-production, arrangements 
 Luis Rodríguez – co-production 
 Bülent Aris – co-production, arrangements 
 Elephant – co-production, arrangements 
 Jeo – mixing 
 Lalo Titenkov – mixing, arrangements 
 Amadeo Crotti – arrangements 
 Wolfgang Wilde – photos
 Stefano Boragno – cover composing
 Ronald Reinsberg – artwork

Charts

Weekly charts

Year-end charts

Certifications

References

External Links 

 
 

2001 albums
Hansa Records albums
Modern Talking albums